Lake Como may refer to:

Lakes
Italy
 Lake Como, a lake of glacial origin in Lombardy, Italy
United States
 Lake Como (Minnesota), a lake in Saint Paul, Minnesota
 Lake Como (New York), a lake in Cayuga County, New York
 Lake Como (Montana), a lake in Ravalli County's Bitterroot Valley
 Lake Como (Colorado), a lake in Alamosa County, Colorado

Places
United States
 Lake Como, Florida, unincorporated community
 Lake Como, Mississippi, unincorporated community
 Lake Como, New Jersey, borough
 Lake Como, Pennsylvania, unincorporated community
 Lake Como, Wisconsin, unincorporated community

See also
 Como Lake (disambiguation)